Venkateswara Temple is a Vaishnavite temple situated in the town of Dwaraka Tirumala of Eluru district of the Indian state of Andhra Pradesh. The temple is dedicated to Lord Venkateswara, an incarnation of Vishnu. The temple is also known by other name like Chinna Tirupati meaning Small Tirupati.

Temple legend and History 
According to Sri Venkateswara Swami Vari Devasthanam:

This pilgrimage centre is called  "Dwaraka Tirumala" after the great saint, "Dwaraka" who located the self manifested idol of Lord "Sri Venkateswara" after severe penance in a ‘Valmikam’ (ant hill). The devotees call Sri Venkateswara as Kali Yuga Vaikunta Vasa. This place is also called "Chinna Tirupati".

As per Sastras North Indian rivers like Ganges and Yamuna are considered to be more and more holy as they go up to the origin and south Indian rivers like Krishna and Godavary are more and more holy as they go down the river to its mouth to the Sea. It is why there are numerous shrines and holy bathing ghats, at close intervals, on both sides of the great grand rivers Krishna and Godavary in their lower regions.

The region covered by our Dwaraka Tirumala is commanding the top most conspicuous position in India, being garlanded by these two great Indian rivers Krishna and Godavary, as pointed out by Brahma Purana.

The devotees who wish to go and offer their donations, or tonsures or any other offerings to Lord Venkateswara, Lord of Tirumala Tirupati, called as "Pedda Tirupati", due to some reason, if they are unable to go there, they can offer their donations, prayers and worship in Dwaraka Tirumala temple.

Dwaraka Tirumala is a famous temple from the ancient times. According to some Puranas, the temple is popular even in Satya Yuga and is still attracting the devotees. According to Brahma Purana, Aja Maharaja, the Grand father of Lord Sri Rama also worshiped Lord Venkateswara for his marriage. On his way to the ‘Swayamvaram’ of Indumati, he passed by the temple. He did not offer prayers in the temple. The bride Indumati garlanded him, but he had to face a battle with the kings who came to the Swayamvaram. He realized that the battle was thrust on him for ignoring the temple on the way. After realizing this, Aja Maharaja prayed to the Lord Venkateswara. Suddenly the kings stopped the battle.

It is a great wonder to see two main idols under one Vimana Sikharam. One idol is a full and complete statue. The other is a half statue of the upper portion of the form of the Lord. The upper portion of the form is a self-manifested idol located by Sage "Dwaraka". The saints of the yore felt the prayers to the Lord are not complete without worshipping His holy feet. So, the saints joined and installed a full statue behind the self-manifested idol, to worship the feet of the Lord according to Vaikhanasa Agamam.

It is believed that the prayers to the smaller statue of the Lord will lead to Moksha, and the big form stands for Dharma, Artha and Kama. The Tiru kalyanotsavam is celebrated twice a year. One for the self manifested idol in the month of  "Vaisakha" and the other for the installed idol in the month of  "Asvijaa".

Magnificence of the Sanctum Sanctorum:

On entering the sanctum sanctorum, one feels a most inspiring and enchanting experience. The presiding mythological deity Lord Venkateswara is visible up to the Bust size and the lower portion is imagined to be in the earth. The holy feet are said to be offered to Bali Chakravarthi in "Patala" for his daily worship. The full size idol of Lord Sri Venkateswara standing at the back of the main idol is said to have been installed by the great social reformer Srimad Ramanuja of the 11th century. The idols of Padmavathi and Nanchari are installed in the Arthamandapa facing east. This is a full equipped shrine to be a Divyasthala.

Combination of Shiva and Vishnu on Adisesha:

The most peculiar aspect here is that the hill appearing to be a serpent in form, even to the naked eye, confirms the mythological version that Anantha, the serpent king has taken up this terrestrial form of serpent hill and is carrying God Mallikarjuna on the hood and Lord Venkateswara on the tail, thus creating a happy and harmonious compromise of Vaishnavism and Saivism at a single place.

Renovation and origin of the present structure:

The magnificent monuments like, Vimana, Mantapa, Gopura, Prakara etc., stand to the credit of Dharma Appa Raoa recent ruler (1762–1827) and the golden ornaments and silver vahanas stand to the credit of the generous queen Rani Chinnamma Rao of Mylavaram, Krishna Dist. (1877–1902). These things immortalize the glory of the shrine.

The main temple is a masterpiece of South Indian Architecture with its five-storied main Rajagopuram facing the south and three other gopurams on the other three sides. The Vimana is in the Nagara style and old Mukhamantapa is extended to a great extent to suit the present day needs. There are several temples of Alwars attached to the Prakara on all sides. The whole spacious compound has been paved with stone and flower trees are grown in an order as if to feast the eye of the pilgrims. There are other shrines in the temple such as  Anjaneya Swamy, Mount Garuda, image of saint Dwaraka and image of Sri Tallakapaka Annamacharya.

Temple Rituals 
Daily Rituals

The daily sevas in Temple include (in order of occurrence) are Suprabhataseva, Pratahkalarchana, Sarva Darsanam, Vedaparayanam, Nityarjita Kalyanam, Maha nivedana, Prabhutvostavam, Sayamkalarchana, Sarvadaranam, Sevakalam, Sarvadarsanam and Ekanta Seva.

Weekly Rituals

Weekly sevas of the Temple include Snapana Pooja on Friday between 6-00 AM to 8-00 AM and Swarna Tulasidala Kainkarya Seva which is  Celebrated only on Wednesdays 6.30 am to 7.00 am. There are no weekly sevas on Saturday and Sunday.

Festivals 
The 'Tiru kalyanotsavam' is the major festival that is observed in Sri Venkateswara Swami Vari Devasthanam or the Dwaraka Tirumala Temple. The festival for the self-manifested idol (small idol) is celebrated in the month of ‘Vaisakha’, while for the installed idol it is celebrated in the month of ‘Aswayuja’ which could be in the month of April–May and September–October respectively every year. Giripradakshina (January), Swamy Vari Vysakha Kalyanam and Radhotsavam (Car festival) (April–May), Pavithrotsavams (September), Swamy Vari Aswayuja Kalyanam and Radhotsavam (Car festival) (September–October), Teppotsavam/ Boat Festival in Nrusimha Sagar Tank (November) are the other major festivals celebrated in the temple.

Temple practices  

Prasadam

"Laddu" is given at Dwaraka Tirumala Temple as prasadam. In this temple Daddojanam, Kattupongali, Sarkarapongali, Pulihora, Kadhambam, Gaarimukkalu, Appalu are being distributed daily to the devotees after Nivedana to the deity.

Hair tonsuring

Many devotees have their head tonsured as "Mokku", an offering to God. When Lord Balaji was hit on his head by a shepherd, a small portion of his scalp became bald. This was noticed by Neela Devi, a Gandharva princess. She felt "such an attractive face should not have a flaw". Immediately, she cut a portion of her hair and, with her magical power, implanted it on his scalp. Lord Balaji noticed her sacrifice. As hair is a beautiful asset of the female form, he promised her that all his devotees who come to his abode would offer their hair to him, and she would be the recipient of all the hair received. Hence, it is believed that hair offered by the devotees is accepted by Neela Devi. The place where pilgrims fulfill their vow of tonsure is called Kalyana Katta, which is to the west of the Main temple. Over 95 barbers, operating in two batches, are available at KalyanaKatta, to perform tonsure.

Sri VenkateswaraSwamy Vari Saswatha Annadhana Trust 
The Devasthanam is maintaining Annadanam Trust from 08 to 12-1994. All the donations received from the donors are being deposited in National Banks and the interest derived thereon is being spent towards distribution of Annaprasadam. Exemption U/Sec.80(G) of Income Tax Act is covered under this scheme.
 The interest derived thereon is being spent towards Anna prasadam.
 Providing free meals (annaprasadam) to 2000 pilgrims in normal days from 11.00 a.m. to 3.00 p.m.
 In Saturdays, Sundays and other auspicious days providing nearly 4000 to 5000 pilgrims and also  providing for the entire pilgrims who are interested to take annaprasadam  from 9.30 a.m. to 4.00p.m.
 The annaprasadam is also provided every Friday from 8.00 p.m. to 11 p.m. to the visiting pilgrims  who came by walk from various places to Dwaraka tirumala.
 At present 3 halls are provided for conducting Annadanam with a capacity of 364 seating.
 The Devasthanam is constructing new Annaprasada Building at uphill with all facilities, 4 spacious halls with a total capacity of 1440 seating to facilitate the donors and pilgrim public with the estimated cost of Rs.14.00 crores and  the said work is in progress.

Gosala  
This Devasthanam is maintaining a Gosala at uphill with more than 300 cows, calves in Eight Sheds. Yielding more than 200 litres of Milk per day. One Veterinary Assistant is working in the gosala and also the cows are well treating and under regular treatment by Veterinary Doctors of Dwaraka Tirumala.. Gokulam with 7 Cows named as Saptha Gokulam. Gopujas are being performed every day in Sri Gokulam from 6.30 am to 12.00 noon and 12.30 P.M. to 6.00 A.M. by the devotees.

Temple management 
The present chairman of the management board is Sri Suraneni Venkata Sudhakara Rao and the Executive officer and joint commissioner is Sri Vendra Trinadha Rao.

Places of Visit 
The following temples which are situated with in a radius of 35 km from Dwaraka Tirumala
 Sri Maddi Anjaneya Swamy Temple, Guravaya Gudem (V)
 Sri Kunkullamma Vari Temple, Dwaraka Tirumala
 Sri Anjaneya and Sri  Subrahmanyeswara Swamyvarla Temples, Dwaraka Tirumala
 Sri Santana Venugopala  Jagannadha Swamy temple, Lakshmipuram (V)
 Sri Seeta Ramachandra Swamyvari Temple, E. Yadavalli (V)
 Sri Bhu Neela Sametha Sri Satyanarayana Swamy Temple, Rangapuram (V)
 Sri Lakshmi Narasimha Swamyvari Temple, I.S. Jagannadha Puram (V)
 Parijata Giri Venkateswara Swamy vari Temple, Jangareddygudem
 Buddha Caves, Jeelakarra Gudem (V)

References

External links 

Hindu temples in West Godavari district
Hindu pilgrimage sites in India
Vaishnavism
Vishnu temples
Buildings and structures in West Godavari district